is a passenger railway station in located in the town of  Komono,  Mie Prefecture, Japan, operated by the private railway operator Kintetsu Railway.

Lines
Naka-Komono Station is a station on the Yunoyama Line, and is located 12.6 rail kilometers from the  opposing terminus of the line at Kintetsu-Yokkaichi Station.

Station layout
The station consists of a single island platform. This makes it possible for trains running in opposite directions one the single-line Yunoyama Line to pass each other at this station.

Platforms

Adjacent stations

History
June 1, 1913 - Yokkaichi Railway opens the station.
February 1, 1918 - Station closes.
April 1, 1927 - Station re-opens.
March 1, 1931 - Due to mergers, station falls under the ownership of the Mie Railway.
February 11, 1944 - Due to mergers, station falls under the ownership of Sanco.
February 1, 1964 - Railway division of Sanco splits off and forms separate company, station falls under the ownership of Mie Electric Railway.
April 1, 1965 - Due to mergers, stations fall under the ownership of Kintetsu.
April 1, 2007 - Support for PiTaPa and ICOCA begins.

Passenger statistics
In fiscal 2019, the station was used by an average of 693 passengers daily (boarding passengers only).

Surrounding area
Komono Town Hall
Ruins of old Komono
Japan National Route 477

See also
List of railway stations in Japan

References

External links

 Kintetsu: Naka-Komono Station

Railway stations in Japan opened in 1913
Railway stations in Mie Prefecture
Komono